Ngāti Hineuru is a Māori iwi (social unit) of New Zealand. In 2015 they reached a Treaty of Waitangi settlement of nearly $50 million with the New Zealand government.

See also
List of Māori iwi

References